The Tioga Pass Entrance Station is the primary entrance for travelers entering Yosemite National Park from the east on the Tioga Pass Road. Open only during the summer months, the entrance station consists of two historical buildings, a ranger station and a comfort station, built in 1931 and 1934 respectively. Both are rustic stone structures with peeled log roof structures, and are examples of the National Park Service rustic style employed at the time by the National Park Service. Two log gate structures that had been removed since the site's original construction were rebuilt in 1999; the stone piers that supported them remain. The use of stone at Tioga Pass set a precedent for the extensive employment of stone construction in other park buildings in the Yosemite high country. Civilian Conservation Corps workers assisted in the entrance station's construction.

The ranger station is a stone building, about  square, set into the slope of the hillside with a porch extending across most of the front. The interior features a lobby space with a substantial stone fireplace, along with living quarters consisting of a bedroom, bath and kitchen. The masonry is oversized, with similarly heavy log porch and roof framing. Window lintels are single massive shaped timbers. The bases of the walls step outward in a reverse corbel. The roof is a simple gable.

The Tioga Pass Entrance Station was listed on the National Register of Historic Places on December 14, 1978.

References

National Park Service ranger stations
Civilian Conservation Corps in California
History of Tuolumne County, California
Park buildings and structures on the National Register of Historic Places in California
Government buildings completed in 1931
Government buildings completed in 1934
National Park Service rustic in Yosemite National Park
National Register of Historic Places in Tuolumne County, California
National Register of Historic Places in Yosemite National Park
1931 establishments in California